Gabriel Zubeir Wako (born 27 February 1941) is a Sudanese Cardinal of the Roman Catholic Church.

Biography
Born in Mboro, Sudan, he was ordained to the priesthood on 21 July 1963. He was appointed as the Bishop of Wau in 1974, and later as the Archbishop of Khartoum in 1981. Zubeir Wako was named the Cardinal-Priest of Sant'Atanasio a Via Tiburtina by Pope John Paul II in the papal consistory held on 21 October 2003. He was one of the cardinal electors who participated in the 2005 papal conclave that selected Pope Benedict XVI and the 2013 conclave that elected Pope Francis.

Cardinal Zubeir Wako escaped an assassination attempt by a member of the predominantly Muslim Messiria tribe when celebrating Sunday Mass on 10 October 2010. He retired as Archbishop of Khartoum on 10 December 2016 and was succeeded by Coadjutor Archbishop Michael Didi Adgum Mangoria.

Views and theology

Family
Zubeir Wako made it a pastoral priority for his episcopacy to engage with families, and particularly with children. The cardinal noted that many children were left orphaned due to civil war in the country which leaves them vulnerable and in a poorer state. It was for that reason that the cardinal enabled for the archdiocese to intensify the "programmes for children in education and healthcare".

However, the cardinal also identified problems that face the family that were particularly of a secular nature. Zubeir Wako noted that "practices such as polygamy, adultery and divorce" quickly emerged threatening traditional marriage and family teachings that the cardinal noted that the Church would continue to uphold.

Sources

External links

 

1941 births
Living people
South Sudanese cardinals
20th-century Roman Catholic bishops in Sudan
20th-century Roman Catholic archbishops in Africa
21st-century Roman Catholic archbishops in Africa
Cardinals created by Pope John Paul II
Roman Catholic archbishops of Khartoum
Roman Catholic bishops of Wau